Here Come the Girls may refer to:

 Here Come the Girls (1918 film), starring Harold Lloyd
 Here Come the Girls (1953 film), starring Bob Hope
 "Here Come the Girls" (song), a song by Ernie K-Doe from 1970
 Here Come the Girls (concert tour), a 2009 concert tour by Chaka Khan, Lulu and Anastacia
 Here Come the Girls (TV series), a 1960 television series